

Theodor Endres (25 September 1876 – 18 January 1956) was a German general during World War II. He was a recipient of the Knight's Cross of the Iron Cross of Nazi Germany. Endres retired from active service on 31 January 1943.

Awards and decorations

 Knight's Cross of the Iron Cross on 13 July 1940 as Generalleutnant zur Verfügung and commander of 212. Infanterie-Division

References

Citations

Bibliography

 

1876 births
1956 deaths
People from Ansbach
People from the Kingdom of Bavaria
German Army personnel of World War I
Military personnel from Bavaria
Recipients of the Knight's Cross of the Iron Cross
Recipients of the Hanseatic Cross (Lübeck)
German Army generals of World War II
Generals of Artillery (Wehrmacht)
Recipients of the clasp to the Iron Cross, 1st class
Lieutenant generals of the Reichswehr